Riva Ganguly Das (born 24 December 1961) is an Indian civil servant who belongs to the Indian Foreign Service cadre. She is the former High Commissioner of India to Bangladesh and former Director General of the Indian Council for Cultural Relations, an autonomous organisation of the Government of India.

Personal life
Riva Ganguly Das spent her childhood in New Delhi. She obtained a postgraduate degree in Political Science from the University of Delhi in 1984. She later taught Political Science at the University of Delhi. She married in 1988 and has two children: a daughter and a son.

Career
She joined the Indian Foreign Service in 1986. Her first posting abroad was in Spain, where she learnt Spanish at Madrid. Thereafter, she worked at the Ministry of External Affairs, Government of India in New Delhi handling External Publicity, Nepal and the Passport & Visa matters. She also headed the Cultural Wing of the Indian High Commission in Dhaka. Subsequently, she served as the Director of the United Nations Economic and Social Affairs (UNES) Division at the Ministry of External Affairs, Government of India in New Delhi. In this capacity, she was a part of negotiations relating to environmental issues, particularly climate change.

Riva Ganguly Das was the Deputy chief of mission at the Indian Embassy in The Hague and the Alternate Permanent Representative of India to the Organisation for the Prohibition of Chemical Weapons, The Hague. She also functioned as the Regional Passport Officer in Jaipur. From 2008 to 2012, she was the Consul General of India in Shanghai.

Later, she was the Head of the Public Diplomacy Division at the Ministry of External Affairs, Government of India, New Delhi. She also headed the Latin America & Caribbean Division at the Ministry of External Affairs, Government of India, New Delhi. In March 2015, Riva Ganguly Das was appointed the Indian Ambassador to Romania. In October 2015, she was concurrently accredited as the Indian Ambassador to Albania and Moldova, with residence in Bucharest (Romania). From March 2016 to July 2017, she served as the Consul General of India in New York.

In March 2019, she was appointed as the High commissioners of India to Bangladesh. In August 2020, She was appointed as the Secretary (East) of MEA.

See also
 Harsh V Shringla
 Pankaj Saran

References

Living people
Indian Foreign Service officers
Ambassadors of India to Romania
Indian women ambassadors
Delhi University alumni
1961 births
High Commissioners of India to Bangladesh